Serbskija novini is  first Serbian language newspaper. It was published in Vienna in 1791.

References

Publications established in 1791
Publications with year of disestablishment missing
Defunct weekly newspapers
Defunct newspapers published in Austria